Perfect Circle can refer to:
A type of circle
The Perfect Circle, a 1997 movie by Bosnian director Ademir Kenovic.
Perfect Circle (novel), 2004 novel by Sean Stewart
Perfect Circle (song), song from R.E.M.'s debut album Murmur
A Perfect Circle, rock band
 The Perfect Circle Co., U.S. manufacturer of piston rings, now part of Mahle GmbH